Bataysk is a former airbase of the Russian Air Force located near Bataysk, Rostov Oblast, Russia.

The base was home to the 801st Training Aviation Regiment between 1952 to 1993 with the Mikoyan-Gurevich MiG-15 (ASCC: Fagot), Aero L-29 Delfín (ASCC: Maya) & Aero L-39 Albatros.

References

Russian Air Force bases